World at War could be an alternative name for World War II

World(s) at War may also refer to:

 Another name for the Darkness Series (2000–2005) by Harry Turtledove
 The World at War (film) (1942), propaganda film produced by the Office of War Information
 The World at War (1973–74), British television series documenting World War II
 Call of Duty: World at War (2008), video game developed by Treyarch
 Gary Grigsby's World at War (2005), computer wargame developed by 2 by 3 Games
 Left Behind: World at War (2005), video film, second sequel to Left Behind
Worlds at War, a 1989 video game
 A World at War, a board game that evolved out of Rise and Decline of the Third Reich